Alfredo Osvaldo Lucero Sosa (born February 8, 1979) is an Argentine professional racing cyclist, who is currently suspended from the sport following an anti-doping violation for the use of prohibited substances.

Major results

2008
 1st Stage 6 Vuelta a San Juan
2009
 1st Overall Tour de San Luis
2013
 1st Stage 3 (TTT) Vuelta a Bolivia

References

External links

1979 births
Living people
People from San Luis, Argentina
Argentine male cyclists